Altenglan is a former Verbandsgemeinde ("collective municipality") in the district of Kusel, Rhineland-Palatinate, Germany. In January 2018 it was merged into the new Verbandsgemeinde Kusel-Altenglan. The seat of the Verbandsgemeinde was in Altenglan.

The Verbandsgemeinde Altenglan consisted of the following Ortsgemeinden ("local municipalities"):

 Altenglan
 Bedesbach
 Bosenbach
 Elzweiler
 Erdesbach
 Föckelberg
 Horschbach
 Neunkirchen am Potzberg
 Niederalben
 Niederstaufenbach
 Oberstaufenbach
 Rammelsbach
 Rathsweiler
 Rutsweiler am Glan
 Ulmet
 Welchweiler

Former Verbandsgemeinden in Rhineland-Palatinate